Sir George Edward Noel Oehlers  (1 April 1908 – 27 October 1968) was a Singaporean politician and lawyer who served as Speaker of the Legislative Assembly of Singapore between 1955 and 1963.

Early life and education
George Edward Noel Oehlers was born to George Rae Oehlers and his wife Frances Maude Oehlers. He was educated at St Andrew's School and Raffles Institution.

Career 
In 1928, Oehlers was called to the bar at Gray's Inn and practised as a barrister in London for three years. 

Upon returning to Singapore, Oehlers became City Councillor in 1933, serving until 1941; he returned to the City Council in 1947, but left ahead of his appointment as Speaker of the Legislative Assembly of Singapore on 1 April 1955 . He left that post in September 1963 to chair the Public Utilities Board. 

From 1963 to 1964, he was also Speaker for the Sabah Legislative Assembly and helped to set up the Sabah Legislative Assembly. From 1965, he was Chairman of Singapore's Industrial Arbitration Tribunal, and from June 1965 to his death, he was President of the Industrial Court of Malaysia.

Personal life
Oehlers married Daphne Eleanor Pye on 20 April 1940. They had five children together: Jillian, Lynnette, Harry, John, and Catharine. Daphne Eleanor Pye died on 15 April 1960, and Oehlers remarried in July 1965 to Annie (Nan) Tessensohn née Flynn, a widow.

His daughter, Jillian was murdered by her husband Henry Scully, along with their two children, who also killed himself when the family was poisoned by gas inhalation in their apartment.

Death
Oehlers died in Kuala Lumpur on 27 October 1968 and was buried in Bidadari Cemetery, Singapore.

Honours
Oehlers was made an Officer of the Order of the British Empire (OBE) in 1953, and Knight Bachelor in 1958 for his public service in Singapore.

References 

1908 births
1968 deaths
Knights Bachelor
Officers of the Order of the British Empire
Speakers of the Parliament of Singapore
Speakers of the Sabah State Legislative Assembly